Salvatore Sirigu  (born 12 January 1987) is an Italian professional footballer who plays as a goalkeeper for  club Fiorentina and the Italy national team.

Sirigu began his career with Venezia, and then Palermo. In 2011, he moved to Paris Saint-Germain. Twice voted the Ligue 1 Goalkeeper of the Year, his honours at the club include four consecutive league titles and all four domestic competitions in both the 2014–15 and 2015–16 seasons. After spending the 2016–17 season on loan to Sevilla and Osasuna, he was signed by Torino in 2017.

A former Italy youth international, Sirigu made his Italy senior debut in 2010, and was selected for UEFA Euro 2012 (finishing in second place), the 2013 FIFA Confederations Cup (finishing in third place), the 2014 FIFA World Cup, UEFA Euro 2016, and UEFA Euro 2020, winning the latter tournament.

Club career

Early career
Born in Nuoro, Sardinia, Italy, Sirigu started his football career in Venezia's youth system playing as a midfielder. He was known for his powerful back heels which he used to take penalty kicks. He had been training as an attacker for a local amateur side, Puri e Forti, at 11 years old, when coaches concluded that his asthma condition would hinder him too much as an outfield player. Instead, observing Sirigu's unusually large hands, they told him to have a go in goal.

Palermo
In 2002, he joined Palermo's youth system. In the 2006–07 season made his debut as a starter in a Coppa Italia match against Sampdoria and a UEFA Cup match against Fenerbahçe. Palermo loaned him to Serie C1 club Cremonese on 12 July 2007 to gain some first team experience.

He spent the 2008–09 season on loan to Serie B side Ancona, but only played 15 games with his club, as Ancona managers Francesco Monaco, and later Sandro Salvioni preferred Brazilian Da Costa over him.

Sirigu successively returned to Palermo as a second-choice keeper, behind new signing Rubinho, for the 2009–10 season. Following a string of unimpressive performances by Rubinho, Palermo coach Walter Zenga, himself a former goalkeeper who was noted for his ability, elevated Sirigu to the starting role for the Week 6 game, an away match against Davide Ballardini's Lazio on 27 September 2009. The game, which also represented Sirigu's official debut in the Italian Serie A, ended in a 1–1 draw, with the young goalkeeper being nominated Man of the Match due to his numerous saves throughout the match. He was subsequently confirmed for the following game, where Sirigu managed to keep a clean sheet in a 2–0 win against Serie A giants Juventus. Since then, Sirigu was regularly featured in the starting line-up and permanently confirmed as first-choice goalkeeper, leading the club to send Rubinho out on loan to Livorno later in January. Due to his performance during his time at Palermo, Sirigu earned the nickname "Walterino", a reference to his coach Walter Zenga, who is regarded as one of the greatest goalkeepers of all time.

On 21 October 2009, Palermo announced to have agreed a contract extension with him, the new contract would have expired in June 2014. His final appearance for Palermo came in the 2011 Coppa Italia Final against Internazionale at Rome's Stadio Olimpico, a 3–1 loss.

Paris Saint-Germain

On 28 July 2011, Sirigu signed a four-year contract with French club Paris Saint-Germain for a transfer fee of €3.895 million. Although initially signed as reserve for Nicolas Douchez, Sirigu started all 38 Ligue 1 matches during his first season at the club as PSG finished as runners-up to Montpellier HSC.

On 27 January 2013, Sirigu broke Bernard Lama's clean-sheet record for a PSG goalkeeper in Ligue 1 (697 minutes). He became the first foreign player to be named UNFP's goalkeeper of the season as PSG won the 2012–13 Ligue 1 championship. Sirigu won the award for the second consecutive year in 2014, with PSG defending their league title and winning the Coupe de la Ligue.

On 2 August 2014, as PSG won the Trophée des Champions 2–0 against Guingamp at the Workers Stadium in Beijing, Sirigu saved a 32nd-minute penalty kick from Mustapha Yatabaré. He signed a contract extension on 10 September of the same year, lasting until 2018. Sirigu remained PSG's first choice goalkeeper in the 2014–15 season for Ligue 1 and UEFA Champions League matches, as the capital club won a domestic treble of the league championship, Coupe de France and Coupe de la Ligue, as well as reaching the quarter-finals of the Champions League.

After PSG completed the signing of German goalkeeper Kevin Trapp from Eintracht Frankfurt in July 2015, deputy sporting director Olivier Letang announced that the club "would not stand in [Sirigu's] way" if he wished to leave Paris. However, the player's agent denied that the player would leave the club. Sirigu remained PSG's first choice goalkeeper in the Coupe de France and Coupe de la Ligue, winning both titles, with Trapp taking his place as the preferred choice in Ligue 1 and UEFA Champions League matches. On 12 February 2016, he announced that he would have left PSG during the previous winter transfer window if "an important proposal had arrived", but ultimately remained with the club for the remainder of the season.

Loans to Sevilla and Osasuna

On 26 August 2016, Sirigu joined La Liga club Sevilla FC on a season-long loan. He made his debut with the club in a 1–1 away draw against Eibar on 17 September. A week later, away to Athletic Bilbao, he was sent off for elbowing Aritz Aduriz, leaving midfielder Vicente Iborra to unsuccessfully face the former's penalty in a 3–1 loss.

Having made only three appearances for the Andalusians, Sirigu moved to fellow league club, strugglers CA Osasuna on 31 January 2017 for the remainder of the season.

Torino
On 27 June 2017, Torino announced they had signed Sirigu on a free transfer. He made his debut for Torino on 12 August, in a 7–1 home win against Trapani in the Coppa Italia third round, and eight days later made a first Serie A appearance in a 1–1 draw away to Bologna.

In July 2018, when Sirigu had a year left on his contract, he extended it until June 2022. On 3 March 2019, he recorded his sixth consecutive Serie A clean sheet, thereby surpassing Luciano Castellini's club record of 517 minutes without conceding a goal in Serie A. On 15 July 2021, his contract with Torino was terminated by mutual consent.

Genoa
On 3 August 2021, Sirigu joined Genoa.

Napoli 
On 11 August 2022, Sirigu joined Napoli on a free transfer.

Fiorentina 
On 25 January 2023, Sirigu moved to Fiorentina.

International career

Sirigu had international experience at the youth level with the Under-18 and Under-19 teams.

On 21 August 2007, he made his debut with the Italy U-21 squad under manager Pierluigi Casiraghi, in a 2–1 friendly win against France held in La Spezia, coming on as a second-half substitute for Andrea Consigli. He took part at the 2009 UEFA European Under-21 Championship as the back up of starter Consigli.

On 28 February 2010, he received his first call-up for the Italian national team by manager Marcello Lippi for a friendly game versus Cameroon to be played at Stade Louis II, Monaco, but did not play, as Federico Marchetti was chosen to start. In May, he was included in Lippi's 28-man provisional 2010 FIFA World Cup squad, but was not included in the 23-man final squad for the tournament.

Upon Cesare Prandelli taking the helm as national coach, Sirigu was named in his first squad list for the friendly against Ivory Coast. He made his international debut in that game losing 1–0, on 10 August 2010. On 3 September, on his second cap, he played his first competitive match, a 2–1 away win against Estonia for Euro 2012 qualifying. He was eventually selected to go to UEFA Euro 2012 as the third choice keeper of the Italian team, behind Gianluigi Buffon and Morgan De Sanctis; he did not feature in the tournament as Italy reached the final.

For the 2013 FIFA Confederations Cup, he was selected as the second-choice keeper behind Buffon. Shortly before the tournament, on 31 May, he kept his first international clean sheet as Italy beat San Marino 4–0 in a friendly in Bologna. In the final tournament, he once again did not feature as Italy finished in third place.

Sirigu was selected by Prandelli as his second-choice goalkeeper for the 2014 FIFA World Cup. However, prior to the tournament, the usual starter and captain Buffon received an ankle injury during training and Sirigu played the opening group game against England in Manaus on 14 June. He made several decisive saves which contributed to the 2–1 Italian victory. Buffon returned to the first team for the remaining two group games against Costa Rica and Uruguay, both of which Italy lost 1–0, and as a result, Italy were eliminated in the first round of the tournament.

On 31 May 2016, Sirigu was included in Antonio Conte's 23-man Italy squad for UEFA Euro 2016. Due to a bout of fever suffered by starting keeper Buffon, Sirigu made his only appearance of the tournament on 22 June, in his nation's final group match, a 1–0 defeat to the Republic of Ireland. Italy were eliminated from the tournament in the quarter-finals, following a penalty shoot-out loss against Germany.

In June 2021, he was included in Italy's squad for UEFA Euro 2020 by manager Roberto Mancini. He made his only appearance of the tournament in Italy's final group match against Wales on 20 June, coming on as a late substitute for Gianluigi Donnarumma in the team's 1–0 victory in Rome, which saw them top their group. On 11 July, Sirigu won the European Championship with Italy following a 3–2 penalty shoot-out victory over England at Wembley Stadium in the final, after a 1–1 draw in extra-time.

Style of play
Regarded as one of the best Italian goalkeepers of his generation, Sirigu was considered in the 2010s as the possible 'heir-apparent' of Gianluigi Buffon as Italy's first-choice goalkeeper, due to his consistency, physical strength, composure, strong mentality, explosive reflexes, and shot-stopping ability between the posts. Although he was frequently compared to Zenga in his youth, his former manager at Cremonese, Emiliano Mondonico, compared him to Dino Zoff because of his calm character under pressure. Former Italy goalkeeper Angelo Peruzzi has also praised Sirigu for his goalkeeping technique and ability to come off his line quickly to collect the ball. Sirigu is also known for his professionalism and leadership qualities, as well as his ability to motivate his teammates, and is therefore considered to be an influential dressing room personality, which makes him a popular figure with his teams' fans.

Career statistics

Club

International

Honours
Paris Saint-Germain
 Ligue 1: 2012–13, 2013–14, 2014–15, 2015–16
 Coupe de France: 2014–15, 2015–16
 Coupe de la Ligue: 2013–14, 2014–15, 2015–16
 Trophée des Champions: 2013, 2014, 2015, 2016
Italy
 UEFA European Championship: 2020; runner-up: 2012
 FIFA Confederations Cup third place: 2013
UEFA Nations League third place: 2020–21
Individual
 Ligue 1 Team of the Year: 2012–13, 2013–14
 Ligue 1 Goalkeeper of the Year: 2012–13, 2013–14
Orders
 5th Class / Knight: Ufficiale Ordine al Merito della Repubblica Italiana: (2021)

References

External links

 Profile at the ACF Fiorentina website 
 FIFA profile
 
 
 Lega Serie A profile 
 FIGC profile 
 

1987 births
Living people
People from Nuoro
Footballers from Sardinia
Italy youth international footballers
Italy under-21 international footballers
Italy international footballers
Italian footballers
Venezia F.C. players
Palermo F.C. players
U.S. Cremonese players
A.C. Ancona players
Paris Saint-Germain F.C. players
Sevilla FC players
CA Osasuna players
Torino F.C. players
Genoa C.F.C. players
S.S.C. Napoli players
ACF Fiorentina players
Association football goalkeepers
Serie A players
Serie B players
Serie C players
Ligue 1 players
La Liga players
UEFA Euro 2012 players
2013 FIFA Confederations Cup players
2014 FIFA World Cup players
UEFA Euro 2016 players
UEFA Euro 2020 players
Italian expatriate footballers
Italian expatriate sportspeople in France
Italian expatriate sportspeople in Spain
Expatriate footballers in France
Expatriate footballers in Spain
UEFA European Championship-winning players
Knights of the Order of Merit of the Italian Republic